MDN Web Docs, previously Mozilla Developer Network and formerly Mozilla Developer Center, is a documentation repository and learning resource for web developers. It was started by Mozilla in 2005 as a unified place for documentation about open web standards, Mozilla's own projects, and developer guides.

MDN Web Docs content is maintained by Mozilla, Google employees, and volunteers (community of developers and technical writers). It also contains content contributed by Microsoft, Google, and Samsung who, in 2017, announced they would shut down their own documentation projects and move all their documentation to MDN Web Docs. Topics include HTML5, JavaScript, CSS, Web APIs, Django, Node.js, WebExtensions, MathML, and others.

History
In 2005, Mozilla Corporation started the project under the name Mozilla Developer Center. Mozilla Corporation still funds servers and employs staff working on the projects.

The initial content for the website was provided by DevEdge, for which the Mozilla Foundation was granted a license by AOL. The site now contains a mix of content migrated from DevEdge and mozilla.org, as well as original and more up-to-date content. Documentation was also migrated from XULPlanet.com.

On Oct 3, 2016, Brave browser added Mozilla Developer Network as one of its default search engines options.

In 2017, MDN Web Docs became the unified documentation of web technology for Google, Samsung, Microsoft, and Mozilla. Microsoft started redirecting pages from Microsoft Developer Network to MDN.

In 2019, Mozilla started Beta testing a new reader site for MDN Web Docs written in React (instead of jQuery; some jQuery functionality was replaced with Cheerio library). The new site was launched on December 14, 2020. Since December 14, 2020, all editable content is stored in a Git repository hosted on GitHub, where contributors open pull requests and discuss changes.

On January 25 2021, the Open Web Docs (OWD) organization was launched as a non-profit fiscal entity to collect funds for MDN development. As of March 2023, the top financial contributors of OWD are Google, Microsoft, Igalia, Canva, and JetBrains.

In March 2022, MDN launched a redesign with a new logo and a paid subscription called MDN Plus.

See also 
 WebPlatform.org

References

External links 
 MDN at 10: The History of MDN

Mozilla
Creative Commons-licensed websites
Computing websites
Internet properties established in 2005
Wikis about programming